WHR may refer to:

In health and wellness
 World Health Report, flagship publication of the World Health Organization
 Waist–hip ratio, a ratio of the circumference of the waist to the hips

In transportation
 West Horndon railway station, a mainline station in Essex, England
 Welsh Highland Railway in North Wales
 West Highland Line (West Highland Railway) in West Scotland
 Wells Harbour Railway in Norfolk
 Whittingham Hospital Railway in Lancashire, England

Other
 Whirlpool Corporation (New York Stock Exchange ticker symbol)
 World hotel rating, a hotel rating and labeling system 
 Waste heat recovery